Luyanda Ntshangase (25 January 1997 – 4 May 2018) was a South African footballer who played in the South African Premier Division for Maritzburg United.

Death
During a friendly game on 1 March 2018, Ntshangase was struck by lightning, suffering burns to his chest. Despite being taken to hospital and placed in an induced coma, he succumbed to his injuries and was pronounced dead on 4 May 2018.

Career statistics

Club

Notes

See also
List of association footballers who died while playing

References

External links

1997 births
2018 deaths
South African soccer players
Association football midfielders
South African Premier Division players
Maritzburg United F.C. players
People from Msunduzi Local Municipality
Deaths from lightning strikes
Association football players who died while playing
Sport deaths in South Africa